King's Highway 137, commonly referred to as Highway 137, is a provincially maintained highway in the Canadian province of Ontario that connects the northern end of Interstate 81 in the U.S. state of New York with Highway 401 via the Canadian span of the Thousand Islands Bridge. While this road connected to the international bridge when it opened in August 1938, it was not designated as a King's Highway until 1965. Highway 137 passes through a portion of the Canadian Shield, a geographic feature which aided construction of the three Canadian spans of the Thousand Islands Bridge.

Route description 

The short  route connects the U.S. border with Highway 401 via the Thousand Islands Bridge. The section on Hill Island is a two-lane highway with limited development and two at-grade intersections, while the mainland section is a four-lane freeway with an interchange at the Thousand Islands Parkway in addition to its northern terminus at Highway 401. Connecting the two segments is a series of bridges between the Ontario mainland and Hill Island, which is a tolled in the southbound direction (northbound tolls are paid on the New York mainland). The entire route is located within Leeds and Grenville United Counties.

Highway 137 begins at the U.S. border crossing between Wellesley and Hill Islands, where it continues as south as I-81 towards Syracuse, New York. After leaving the toll plaza and passing the duty free stores, the route curves northeast where it travels past the Thousand Islands Tower observation deck before turning north. The highway crosses three spans of the Thousand Islands Bridge over the Saint Lawrence River, including a  Warren truss bridge between Hill Island and Constance Island, a  arch bridge between Constance and Georgina Islands, and a  suspension bridge between Georgina Island and the Ontario mainland.

On the northern shore of the St. Lawrence, Highway 137 abruptly turns eastward, passing a road maintenance facility and the southbound toll booths before curving back northward as it widens into a divided highway at an interchange with the Thousand Islands Parkway. The final segment of the highway travels through forest before ending at a trumpet interchange with Highway 401 midway between Gananoque and Brockville. The geography surrounding the entire route features large rock outcroppings of the Frontenac Arch in the Canadian Shield through which the highway passes. The close proximity of bedrock to the surface resulted in substantial savings during the construction of the bridges along the route.

History 

The Thousand Islands Bridge system was opened in a ceremony on August 18, 1938 by Canadian prime minister William Lyon Mackenzie King and American president Franklin D. Roosevelt. Also in attendance was Albert Matthews, lieutenant governor of Ontario, representing the King in Right of Ontario.
The new bridge approach included an interchange with the St. Lawrence River Road, known today as the Thousand Islands Parkway, but it was not numbered. Until 1965, the route was known as the Ivy Lea Bridge Approach. Highway 137 was first designated in 1965 as far as the Thousand Islands Parkway.
It was extended to the newly opened Highway 401 in 1968.
The route has remained unchanged in the years since then.

Exit list

References

External links

 Highway 137 at OntHighways.com
 Highway 137 - Length and Route

137